Magic Stones is a video game based on Celtic mythology and is a mix between a role-playing video game and a card game. It was developed by Winter Wolves and was released as shareware for the Macintosh and Windows platforms.

Gameplay
The game plays like a sandlot game where the player creates their druid and then explores randomly generated dungeons to gain experience, fight in a tournament or play the "Quest Mode".

The initial druid creation, similarly to the classic “Character Creation” present in many RPGs, is the first step in playing a game in Aravorn. The creation is rather simple, and consists of choosing a starting magic school, a gender and a character "background". The player's druid initially starts at level 1, and is quite powerless. The player needs to gain experience to obtain higher levels (and thus more power).  This can be done in 3 different ways:

Gather Artifacts - If the player chooses this option, they can roam freely throughout the entire kingdom of Aravorn in search of interesting places like abandoned temples, enchanted forests, cursed islands, and so on. Each of these special places has hidden treasures: whether a magic formula, an amulet, a rune, or something else, each of these objects will increase the druid's power, as well as experience, thus helping to increase a character's level.

Challenge Druid - The second option leads the player to the Black Tower, the place where the druids challenge one other to duels every year. There will be 16 different druids in the tournament and the player will challenge them to a duel. Play proceeds to the death, until the winners are announced.

Quest Mode - This new playing mode introduces the player to various quests, each with its own custom story and new avatars. The player can also use new creatures from the realm of Life and Spirit Magic, and as well new unique neutral creatures and/or characters. New quest will be released periodically every 3–4 months free of charge for registered users.

The main gameplay occurs on the battle screen, where the player can place their Avatars (cards) in two rows. The first one can do both melee (close) and long-range attacks, while the second one can do only long-range attacks. There are over 20 player-controlled avatars and over 40 "neutral" ones that occasionally can be controlled by the player itself during the Quest Mode.

The game plays like a classic turn-based game, with each side attacking/defending. The player can also cast spells that they have acquired to empower their avatars or weaken their enemies. Druids also have inventories of items, each one with particular properties, that can be worn during battles to help them defeat opponents.

External links
Official website

2005 video games
MacOS games
Windows games
Role-playing video games
Digital collectible card games
Video games based on Celtic mythology
Video games developed in Italy